Sharifabad Rural District is in Sharifabad District of Pakdasht County, Tehran province, Iran. At the National Census of 2006, its population was 8,878 in 2,368 households. There were 9,250 inhabitants in 2,662 households at the following census of 2011. At the most recent census of 2016, the population of the rural district was 9,362 in 2,638 households. The largest of its 16 villages was Aliabad-e Abu ol Qasem Khani, with 3,067 people.

References 

Pakdasht County

Rural Districts of Tehran Province

Populated places in Tehran Province

Populated places in Pakdasht County